Dancing on Ice is a British television series presented by Phillip Schofield alongside Holly Willoughby from 2006 to 2011, who then returned in 2018, and Christine Bleakley from 2012 to 2014. The series features celebrities and their professional partners figure skating in front of a panel of judges. The series, broadcast on ITV, started on 14 January 2006 and ended on 9 March 2014 after the contract was not renewed by ITV.

On 4 September 2017, it was announced that a revived series would air on ITV from 7 January 2018 with Schofield and Willoughby returning as hosts. Jayne Torvill and Christopher Dean assumed new roles as head judges, alongside original judge Jason Gardiner and new judge Ashley Banjo. In 2020, John Barrowman replaced Gardiner as a judge, however on 3 October 2021, it was announced that Barrowman would not be returning to the judging panel. His replacement was later announced as Strictly Come Dancing professional Oti Mabuse. During the finale of the fifthteenth series, it was confirmed that the show would return in 2024 for its sixteenth series.

Background and history
The series was announced in November 2004 and originally titled Stars on Thin Ice, the show was renamed following the failure of ITV's celebrity oriented 2005 summer schedule. Dancing on Ice is frequently compared to the BBC's Strictly Come Dancing. In 2004, the BBC aired a Strictly special entitled Strictly Ice Dancing at Christmas, which was won by England goalkeeper David Seaman, who later became a contestant on the first series of Dancing on Ice.

ITV's show was given a January premiere amidst network doubts about its viability but became a surprise hit in Britain, where it became the third highest rated television show of 2006. It attained an impressive 13 million viewers for the final in March. Britain's best-known ice-skating duo and former Olympic champions Jayne Torvill and Christopher Dean help to train the aspiring dancers, and also appear throughout the show with comments and advice. Head Coach Karen Barber also trains the skaters for the live show. From the beginning, Torvill and Dean opened every episode with a performance, with the exception of the second, third and fourth shows of the fourth series, when Torvill performed alone due to Dean's recovery from a shoulder operation. From 2012, they performed less frequently.

Schofield previously presented with Holly Willoughby, with commentary originally from Tony Gubba (later Simon Reed) and voiceovers done by John Sachs. The members of The Ice Panel were originally Karen Barber, Jason Gardiner, Nicky Slater and Robin Cousins, and the fifth judge varied from series to series: Karen Kresge in the first series, Natalia Bestemianova in the second, Ruthie Henshall in the third and fourth and Emma Bunton in the fifth. In series 6, there were only three judges: Gardiner, Cousins and Bunton.

During the shows first two series, it ran two supplementary programmes – Dancing on Ice Defrosted, presented by Stephen Mulhern, and Dancing on Ice Exclusive (or Dancing on Ice Extra during series 1) presented by Andi Peters alongside Andrea McLean in series 1 and Ben Shephard in series 2. In mid-2007, it was announced that both shows would not return to accompany the third series as the audience attracted was out of ITV2's target range. As part of ITV's new revamped schedule at the start of 2008, from the third series, the show aired on a Sunday night and featured updated music and new titles as well as redesigned graphics. The series 3 finale was a massive draw, pulling an average 11.7 million viewers (up from 9.6 million the previous year) peaking at 12.6 million viewers over the two-hour slot, up over a million from series 2.

The seventh series began on 8 January 2012, with Torvill and Dean as coaches for which they will be paid £250,000 each series. Christine Bleakley was announced as the new co-presenter of the show replacing Holly Willoughby, whilst Katarina Witt and Louie Spence replaced Emma Bunton and Jason Gardiner on the judging panel. On 20 November 2012, it was announced that Gardiner was to return to the panel for the 2013 series, replacing Spence. The full judging panel for the 2013 series was revealed on 28 December 2012, with former The Pussycat Dolls singer Ashley Roberts joining and Karen Barber returning to the panel after acting as head coach on the show the previous two years; they joined Gardiner and head judge Robin Cousins on the panel.

Cancellation and revival
On 21 May 2013, Torvill and Dean announced that they would leave the series after its ninth series in 2014, leading to speculation that the whole show would be axed. On 24 June 2013 it was rumoured that Dancing on Ice may continue after they have left with new coaches, however, on 22 October 2013 it was confirmed that the show would end after its ninth series in 2014.

On 4 September 2017, ITV confirmed that the show would return in 2018. Torvill and Dean will return to the show as head judges along with Schofield and Willoughby as presenters. On 19 October 2017, Ashley Banjo was confirmed as a judge. Later that month, Gardiner confirmed that he would return to the judging panel. Ashley's brother, Jordan Banjo, acts as the show's backstage digital host. ITV Racing's betting presenter Matt Chapman was announced as the new commentator on 16 December 2017. However, following the first live show on 7 January, Chapman claimed that he had "quit" the show but it was later confirmed to be a decision by the ITV producers, responding to pressure from the TV audience. Sportscaster Sam Matterface was later confirmed as Chapman's replacement. On 21 August 2019, Gardiner confirmed that he would not return for the 12th series in 2020. At the start of September, series one contestant John Barrowman was confirmed as his replacement. On 3 October 2021, ITV announced that Barrowman would not be returning to the judging panel in 2022. In December, it was confirmed that Strictly Come Dancing professional Oti Mabuse would replace him for the fourteenth series.

Format
Each week the celebrities and their partners perform a live ice dance routine. The four/five (as of Series 8) judges (commonly known as the Ice Panel) judge each performance and give a mark between 0.0 and 10.0 (0.0 to 6.0 between series 1 and 5), depending on the performance. These total scores then create a leaderboard which combines with the public vote in order to determine the two lowest placed couples. As this is the case, the pair with the lowest score from the judges can avoid being in the bottom two if the public vote for them.

Once the scores and votes are combined to form the final leaderboard for that week's show, the two/three couples at the bottom compete in a final showdown known as the "Skate Off", where they perform a different routine known as the Save-Me Skate. Unlike the main routines, this routine can be reused if the celebrity is in the Skate Off more than once. Once the couples have performed their routines for the judging panel, the judges decide on who deserves to stay and cast their votes, based on their second performance. The couple with the most votes from the judges receives a place in the following week's show, while the couple with the fewest votes leaves the competition. One couple leaves the competition each week, but in series 7, two couples left in one week, due to numbering issues. This also occurred in series 10, 11 and 14 respectively.

A live reunion special was staged one week after the end of each season, with all celebrities talking about their experiences during the season, and answering questions from a live studio audience. Torvill and Dean themselves then made a special in-studio appearance towards the end, thanking the contestants, hosts and judges, and the viewers for their votes.

Required elements
From Series 1 to 8, there was an element that the skaters were required to perform as part of their routines. From Series 9, the required skating elements format was removed due to the All-Star nature of the series. It was brought back in Series 10, known as the judges' challenge. The required elements included:

 Assisted and unassisted jumps
 Use of a prop
 Forming a spiral position
 Flying above the ice, suspended by a harness
 A one footed spin
 Shadow steps
 Classic moves of Torvill and Dean, sometimes with a choice between them
 Cross rolls
 Toe step sequences
 Pair spin
 One unique move
 Solo skate
 Change of edge

Studio set and ice rink
The show was based in the George Lucas Stage at Elstree Studios from 2006 to 2010. In 2011 the show was broadcast from Shepperton Studios. In 2012 it returned to Elstree with a new, more modern set. There were several areas of the Elstree studio. The Tunnel was to the left of the rink and was where the couples entered the rink. The Ice Cave was situated at the back of the rink and was where Phillip Schofield  and Torvill and Dean stood to interview the couples. The Judges and Contestants Area was to the right of the rink and was where the judging panel were based, and where Holly Willoughby or Christine Bleakley stood to speak to them and the couples.

For the 2018 revival series the show was relocated to a purpose-built studio at RAF Bovingdon.

Series overview
Fifteen series have been broadcast to date, as summarised below.

Presenters, judges and coaches

Presenter timeline
Colour key

Judging panel
Colour key

Professional skaters

 Winner
 Runner-up
 Third place
 First eliminated
 Withdrew or injured
 Participating

Current

Former

Notes and statistics
 Matt Evers is the only professional skater who has taken part in every series of the show.
 Maria Filippov, Daniel Whiston, Matt Evers and Vanessa Bauer have all tied for the most final appearances ever, with four.
 Daniel Whiston & Maria Filippov are the only professionals to have won more than once.
 Vanessa Bauer is also the only pro to have reached more than two finals in a row, appearing in three consecutive finals in total.
 Only five professionals have won in their first series on the show, namely Daniel Whiston (Series 1), Melanie Lambert (Series 2), Vanessa Bauer (Series 10), Angela Egan (Series 13) and Olivia Smart (Series 15).
 Only three professionals have won in their last series on the show, namely Maria Filippov (series 9), Alex Murphy (series 12) and Karina Manta (series 14).

Main series results

Series 1 (2006)

The first series began on Saturday 14 January 2006 and ended on Saturday 4 March 2006, including ten celebrity skaters. The co-presenters were Phillip Schofield and Holly Willoughby, while The Ice Panel consisted of one-time World Junior Figure Skating champion Nicky Slater, choreographer Karen Kresge, theatre producer Jason Gardiner, two-time NHK Trophy champion Karen Barber and 1980 Olympic champion Robin Cousins.

The contestants for the first series were:

Series 2 (2007)

The second series began on Saturday 20 January 2007. In it, 11 celebrities competed, compared to ten in the first series. The final was held on Saturday 17 March 2007. Phillip Schofield and Holly Willoughby returned to co-present, while Nicky Slater, Jason Gardiner, Karen Barber and Robin Cousins returned to The Ice Panel. Karen Kresge did not return as a judge for a second series and was replaced by five-time European champion Natalia Bestemianova.

The contestants for the second series were:

Series 3 (2008)

The commissioning of the third series of Dancing on Ice was first confirmed by Phillip Schofield at the BAFTA awards.
The third series began on 13 January 2008, moving to Sunday nights in the process and ended on 16 March 2008, when Suzanne Shaw was crowned as the winner. Schofield and Holly Willoughby returned to co-present, while Nicky Slater, Jason Gardiner and Robin Cousins returned to The Ice Panel. The third series saw the replacement of judge Natalia Bestemianova by West End star Ruthie Henshall. And for the first time in the history of the series, a contestant withdrew due to injury, and it was TV presenter Michael Underwood who did so.

The contestants for the third series were:

Series 4 (2009)

The fourth series started on 11 January 2009 and ended on 22 March 2009. Phillip Schofield and Holly Willoughby returned to co-present as well as Jayne Torvill, Christopher Dean and Karen Barber to mentor the celebrities. Barber, Nicky Slater, Jason Gardiner, Robin Cousins and Ruthie Henshall all returned to The Ice Panel for the fourth series.

The contestants for the fourth series were:

Series 5 (2010)

The fifth series began on 10 January 2010 and ended on 28 March 2010. Jayne Torvill, Christopher Dean and Karen Barber returned to train the celebrities, with Phillip Schofield and Holly Willoughby returning as co-presenters. Barber, Nicky Slater, Jason Gardiner and Robin Cousins returned for their fifth series on The Ice Panel. However, Ruthie Henshall did not return for her third series on The Ice Panel and was replaced by singer Emma Bunton. In addition to the main show, there was also a new spin-off show called Dancing on Ice Friday which gives viewers the insight to the training of the celebrities. It was presented by Ben Shephard and former contestant Coleen Nolan and broadcast from 8 pm to 8.30 pm on Friday evenings on ITV.

Cousins did not appear as a judge for weeks 6 and 7 due to commentary commitments for the Winter Olympics, so Barber was temporary head judge during Cousins's absence. Michael Ball took his place on 14 February and Angela Rippon filled in for him on 21 February.

The contestants for the fifth series were:

Series 6 (2011)

The sixth series started on 9 January 2011 and ended on 27 March 2011 with the following 16 celebrities taking part. The first two episodes were qualifying rounds, in each of which eight couples skated and two were eliminated, so that only 12 couples reached the competition proper. For the first time, viewers in the Republic of Ireland were able to vote via the TV3 Ireland website. Christopher Dean and Jayne Torvill returned to mentor the contestants, with Karen Barber moving from The Ice Panel to the role of head coach. Phillip Schofield and Holly Willoughby returned as co-presenters for their sixth series. Jason Gardiner, Robin Cousins and Emma Bunton returned to The Ice Panel, but Nicky Slater did not.

The contestants for the sixth series are:

Series 7 (2012)

The seventh series started on 8 January 2012. The celebrities were revealed on 3 January 2012. Phillip Schofield returned as presenter and was joined by Christine Bleakley following the departure of Holly Willoughby, with Christopher Dean, Jayne Torvill and Karen Barber returning to mentor the celebrities. Robin Cousins was the only judge from series 6 to return, with six consecutive European champion Katarina Witt and choreographer Louie Spence replacing Emma Bunton and Jason Gardiner.

The contestants for the seventh series are as follows. Singer Chesney Hawkes was originally part of the line-up, but withdrew after sustaining an injury. His replacement was The X Factor contestant Chico.

Series 8 (2013)

The eighth series started on 6 January 2013.

The line-up was officially announced on 18 December 2012. Consisting of twelve couples, series 8 was the shortest series to air, and had the lowest number of couples since series 3 in 2008.

Christopher Dean, Jayne Torvill and Karen Barber returned to mentor the celebrities, with Barber returning to The Ice Panel after two series away. Phillip Schofield and Christine Bleakley returned to co-present. Head judge Robin Cousins and Barber were joined on The Ice Panel by former judge Jason Gardiner and former The Pussycat Dolls singer Ashley Roberts, who replaced Louie Spence and Katarina Witt.

Series 9: All-Stars (2014)

The ninth series of Dancing on Ice began airing on 5 January 2014. It was announced on 21 May 2013 by Christopher Dean and Jayne Torvill that it would be their last series as coaches, and ITV's Director of Television, Peter Fincham, confirmed that the programme would be cancelled after series 9. On 24 June 2013, it was reported that Dancing on Ice could continue with new coaches, however, on 22 October 2013 it was confirmed that this would be the show's last series.

It was later announced that the ninth series would be an "all-star" series, featuring former winners and other contestants from the eight previous series. The 14-strong line up was revealed on 11 December 2013; it included six former champions, six other top-four finishers, plus Joe Pasquale and Todd Carty.

Phillip Schofield and Christine Bleakley returned to co-present; Christopher Dean, Jayne Torvill and Karen Barber returned to mentor the celebrities; Robin Cousins, Jason Gardiner, Karen Barber and Ashley Roberts returned for their respective ninth, eighth, seventh and second series on The Ice Panel. Cousins was absent for weeks 6 and 7 due to commentating the 2014 Winter Olympics, so former judge Nicky Slater returned in his place and Barber was temporary head judge.

Series 10 (2018)

On 4 September 2017, it was announced on This Morning that Dancing on Ice would return with Willoughby and Schofield as presenters, and Torvill and Dean returning in new roles of head judges. It was also revealed that Jason Gardiner would be returning to the Ice Panel, along with Diversity member Ashley Banjo. With the announcement of the new series it was confirmed that the show would have a new set, new graphics, a new logo and a new theme tune, including the contestants and professionals faces for the first time. The show's new logo was released on the official Twitter account. The series will be filmed at RAF Bovingdon.

Series 11 (2019)

It was announced on 25 January 2018 that Dancing on Ice would return for an eleventh series in 2019. The presenters and judges remain the same as for series 10, with the exception of Jordan Banjo, who was unable to return due to a clash of commitments. The participating celebrities began to be confirmed on 1 October 2018. This series is the first not to feature three-time Dancing on Ice champion Daniel Whiston, who instead took on the role of Associate Creative Director. Former judge Karen Barber also returned as head coach.

Series 12 (2020)

In this series John Barrowman, a former contestant, joined as a judge, replacing Jason Gardiner. Jayne Torvill, Christopher Dean and Ashley Banjo also returned as judges. Series 12 began on 5 January 2020. On 18 December 2019, it was announced that Michael Barrymore, who was originally announced as a contestant, had withdrawn from the show due to a broken hand. He was later replaced by Radzi Chinyanganya.

Series 13 (2021)

On 24 June 2020, it was announced that Alex Murphy, the show's reigning champion, had not been re-contracted for the upcoming series, and on 19 July 2020, that Brianne Delcourt would be leaving the show to spend more time with her husband, Kevin Kilbane, who she partnered last series. On 30 August 2020, it was announced that Alexander Demetriou and Carlotta Edwards wouldn't be on the main line-up of professional skaters. On 7 October 2020, it was announced that Jess Hatfield, Oscar Peter and Tom Naylor won't be returning either. They have all been replaced by returning professionals Andy Buchanan and Robin Johnstone and new professionals Angela Egan, Joe Johnson, Karina Manta, Klabera Komini and Yebin Mok.

Series 14 (2022)

It was announced during the previous series final that the show would return for its fourteenth series. It was announced on 3 October 2021 that John Barrowman would not return to the judging panel. Strictly Come Dancing professional Oti Mabuse was later revealed as his replacement.

Series 15 (2023)

It was announced during the final of the previous series that the show would return for its fifteenth series in January 2023. Professional skaters Andy Buchanan, Robin Johnstone, Angela Egan, Joe Johnson and reigning champion Karina Manta did not return for this series and were replaced by returning professionals Sylvain Longchambon, Vicky Ogden and Klabera Komini, as well as new professional skater Olivia Smart.

Series averages
All information in this table comes from BARB.

Awards and nominations

Spin-offs
Like many other reality TV shows, Dancing on Ice has had a number of supplementary shows. The first was Dancing on Ice Defrosted. It was presented by Stephen Mulhern and aired on ITV2 immediately after the main ITV show and again after the results show. The show featured opinions from celebrity guests and past contestants as well as from Torvill and Dean, the judges, presenters and competitors. Judge Nicky Slater also offered in-depth analysis of various performances using the latest video technology that the judges use to judge performances.

The second spin-off show was originally called Dancing on Ice Extra and was presented by Andi Peters and Andrea McLean, both competitors in the first series. Midway through the first series Paul O'Grady left ITV to join Channel 4 meaning that ITV had no show to put on air at 5 pm. The format of Dancing on Ice Defrosted was modified so that it could be broadcast every weekday. Due to Andrea's maternity leave during the second series she did not return to present the show and therefore Ben Shephard joined the show as the anchor presenter, and, unlike during the previous, series Andi Peters was now a roving reporter around the studio. For its second run the show was renamed Dancing on Ice Exclusive. Neither of these first two spin-off shows returned in 2008 nor 2009.

In 2010 it was announced that a new spin-off show would accompany Dancing on Ice, named Dancing on Ice Friday, presented by Ben Shephard and Coleen Nolan.

Champion of Champions (2007)
This took place on Saturday 24 March 2007 and featured finalists from both Series 1 and Series 2. All six celebrities did one routine each, scored by the judges, and then voted on by the public. The two couples finishing first after the public voted skated again in the skate off to decide the winner. The skaters that did not reach the skate off – 3rd to 6th – were announced "in no particular order", so ranks may not be accurate.

Dancing on Ice at Christmas (2008)
For Christmas 2008, Torvill and Dean went head to head with Jayne Torvill having a team of three female celebrities, and Christopher Dean having a team of three male celebrities. The judges were the usual line-up of Robin Cousins, Ruthie Henshall, Jason Gardiner, Karen Barber and Nicky Slater. Holly Willoughby and Phillip Schofield presented the 90-minute programme.

Team Torvill scored 80 points to Team Dean's 79.5 and won the show by also receiving the majority of the audience votes.

Suzanne Shaw received the perfect score of 30 for the third time in a row. In her last two appearances on the show she has picked up the trophy.

Dancing on Ice: Make Me a Star (2008)
A 30-minute prime time spin-off to Dancing on Ice premiered on 26 January 2008 and ran for a few episodes, presented solely by Holly Willoughby. This both showed some exclusive footage of the celebrities training for the Sunday night main show and followed Torvill and Dean on the search for a member of the public to perform on the Dancing on Ice final in 2009.

Shows:
 Kyran Bracken skated with his new partner (they have been on Holiday on Ice)
 David Seaman and Melanie Lambert showed what to expect on the Tour
 Clare Buckfield and Andrei Lipanov did a new performance of "Reach"

Dancing on Ice: Ice Star (2009)
This was shown after the announcement of the bottom two had been made but before the skate off. It showed Torvill and Dean's search for an entertainment act on ice, with auditions from all kinds of ice skaters. The winner skated live on the Dancing on Ice 2009 final and join Torvill and Dean on tour.

From a shortlist of 20 acts, Torvill and Dean invited only four back to give another performance in the Dancing on Ice studio. The final four were:
 Hannah and Daniel – Child pairs skaters
 Nick Rigby – Figure skater
 The Oxford Freestylers – Stunt and trick performers
 The Elody – Skating girlband

The Oxford Freestylers won and performed live on the Dancing on Ice 2009 final.

Dancing on Ice Goes Gold (2012)
An Olympic special aired on 22 July 2012, before the London 2012 Summer Olympics. It featured medal-winning Olympic athletes.

The one-off special featured the judges from series 7, with Phillip Schofield and Christine Bleakley returning as presenters. Torvill & Dean unveiled a new and specially-crafted performance. Head judge, Robin Cousins also performed a solo routine for first time in twelve years.

The judges scores were added to the studio audiences votes to decide the winner. No public vote took place, as the programme was recorded earlier in the year.

Dancing on Ice Friday (2010)
A brand new spin-off show for the 2010 series of Dancing on Ice, appropriately called Dancing on Ice Friday, gave viewers the insight to the training of the celebrities over the last week. It was presented by television presenter Ben Shephard and former contestant and Loose Women star Coleen Nolan. The show was broadcast from 8 pm to 8.30 pm on Friday evenings on ITV throughout the duration of the main shows season. STV who broadcast the main show did not broadcast this on the Friday evening but after repeating the previous week's main show on the following Saturday afternoon. Due to poor ratings, Dancing on Ice Friday was axed prior to the 2011 series.

Dancing on Ice at Christmas (2019)
A Christmas special aired on 22 December 2019 featuring performances from all the couples of the series 12, previous winner Ray Quinn, series 11 contestant Gemma Collins, and Torvill and Dean. Jake Quickenden was also supposed to be performing, but on 13 November 2019, it was announced that he had to pull out due to a neck injury.

Dancing on Ice: The Greatest Show on Ice (2021)
Due to a number of early withdrawals and to give the remaining contestants sufficient time to recover from any injuries, series 13 was paused for one week and the episode scheduled to air on 21 February was replaced with a pre-recorded special celebrating the most memorable moments in the show's history.

Dancing on Ice: The Tour

References

External links

 
 
 
 
 

2006 British television series debuts
2000s British reality television series
2010s British reality television series
2020s British reality television series
British television series revived after cancellation
 
English-language television shows
Figure skating in the United Kingdom
Figure skating on television
ITV reality television shows
Television series by ITV Studios
Television shows shot at Elstree Film Studios